The Armement Air-Sol Modulaire (Modular Air-to-Ground Armament), commonly called AASM or HAMMER, is a French precision-guided munition developed by Safran Electronics & Defense. AASM comprises a frontal guidance kit and a rear-mounted range extension kit matched to a dumb bomb. The weapon is modular because it can integrate different types of guidance units and different types of bombs.

The basic version features a  bomb plus hybrid inertial navigation system (INS) / Global Positioning System (GPS) guidance.

It entered service in 2007 with the French Air Force and Naval Aviation, equipping the Dassault Rafale and Mirage 2000. In 2011, AASM was given the name HAMMER (highly agile modular munition extended range). Chosen for commercial reasons, the English acronym is also often used in French. The French pronunciation of "AASM" is Deux-A-S-M or A-deux-S-M.

Development 
The program started in 1997, when the Délégation Générale pour l'Armement (DGA), the French defense procurement agency, launched an international competition on the design for the weapon. In 2000, a contract was awarded to SAGEM for an initial lot of AASM GPS/INS bomb kits, expected at the time to be delivered from 2004 and to enter service the following year.

Validation 
A test campaign to validate in flight the main performances of this AASM variant started on December 6, 2004, and ended on July 26, 2005.

While demonstrating excellent results, this campaign showed the need to change some of the aerodynamic features of the weapon. To compensate for delays in AASM deliveries in 2008 France ordered dual-mode (laser- and GPS/INS-guided) GBU-49 Enhanced Paveway II kits for integration with Mirage 2000D and Rafale fighter-bombers. The GPS/INS + IIR guided version completed its qualification tests on July 9, 2008, after three firings at the DGA's missile test range in Biscarosse. This 250 kg IR version performed a night launch from a Rafale fighter-bomber at DGA's Biscarosse test range in December 2010.

According to Safran Electronics & Defense, the weapon was launched at a range of more than 50 km from the target, which was hit within one meter. A 125 kg version was successfully test fired on January 27, 2009, and a laser guided variant was air-launched for the first time on June 17, 2010.

Cost 
According to French Senate's Comité des Prix de Revient des fabrications d'Armement (CPRA) cited by the daily La Tribune, the total cost of the AASM program including development costs and the delivery of 2348 kits is €846m. On that basis the per-weapon cost is $300,000 or twelve times the cost of the comparable American JDAM, although the latter has been manufactured in much larger quantities (~250,000 kits) and would be reasonable to expect a drastic reduction of the price of the French munition if larger contracts are signed and economies of scale are achieved.

The 2012 defence budget presented to the Senate reported the project had cost €592.2m (~US$800m) with a unit cost of €164,000, or €252,000 including development costs.

Variants 
AASM comes in several variants according to its size and the type of guidance used.

 The current model features a 250 kg bomb matched to a nose-mounted guidance kit and a rear-mounted range extension kit, containing a rocket booster and enlarged fins. There is also a 125 kg, first tested in 2009, and a proposed 1000 kg version.
 As for guidance, the basic version combines data from a Global Positioning System (GPS) receiver and an inertial navigation system (INS) unit through Kalman filtering, achieving a  circular error probability (CEP). This "decametric" all-weather variant is complemented by a "metric" day/night fair weather version which adds infrared homing (IIR) guidance that matches the target area with a target model stored in its memory for a  CEP.
 A third version uses laser guidance instead of IIR allowing it to hit moving targets with more precision. It was qualified in April 2013.

In October 2010, these versions were given alphanumeric designations with the INS/GPS version becoming the SBU-38 (SBU=Smart Bomb Unit), the INS/GPS/IIR version becoming the SBU-54 and the INS/GPS/SALH version becoming the SBU-64; the system as a whole was renamed Hammer to make it more appealing to export customers.

The 1000 kg version commenced testing in 2020, with inert separation trials from a Rafale. Service entry is planned for 2022.

Operational use 
The first order for AASM was placed by the DGA in 2000 for a total of 744 units; deliveries started in 2007 after a two-year delay in development. In 2009 a second order for 680 units was placed, by the end of that year deliveries had reached 334.

Afghanistan 
AASM made its combat debut on April 20, 2008, during the War in Afghanistan when a Rafale fighter dropped two in support of ground troops.

Libya 
On 24 March 2011 it was reported that an AASM bomb dropped from a Dassault Rafale was used to destroy a Libyan Air Force G-2 Galeb light ground attack/trainer jet, the first Libyan warplane to challenge the no-fly zone during the 2011 Libyan civil war, on the runway just after the plane had landed at Misrata Airport.

On 6 April 2011, it was reported that a AASM bomb dropped from a Dassault Rafale was used to destroy a Libyan tank at a range of 55 km.

In Libya, 225 AASM bombs have been dropped 

"Also referred to as the Hammer, the AASM weapon has impressed during the campaign to date. Incorporating a precision guidance kit and propulsion system, the design will eventually be available for use with standard bombs weighing between 125kg and 1,000kg, although a 250kg version is the only one currently in service. Sagem cites a range capability of more than 32nm from high altitude, or 8nm from low level. Launches can also be made from an off-axis angle of up to 90°, while up to six weapons can be fired against individual targets in a single pass and with just one trigger press." And "Libya represents the first opportunity for the French air force to employ the Thales Damocles targeting pod, although the Navy gave the system its combat debut over Afghanistan in late 2010."

India

According to a report by Hindustan Times, India placed an order for "large numbers" of the Hammer in September 2020 and deliveries will be completed by the end of November 2020. The reports adds that the French Air Force will transfer some of its supplies of Hammer to India to ensure immediate deliveries.

India has started the process of integrating Hammer missile to its indigenous fighter Tejas.

Operators

Current operators

See also 
 Bombe Guidée Laser
 LT PGB
 LS PGB
 JDAM
 Paveway IV
 HGK (bomb)
 Spice
 Denel Dynamics Umbani

References

External links
 MBDA page
 Sagem page

Post–Cold War weapons of France
Military equipment introduced in the 2000s
Guided bombs
Aerial bombs of France
Air-to-surface missiles of France